The 1973 Cupa României Final was the 35th final of Romania's most prestigious football cup competition. It was disputed between Chimia Râmnicu Vâlcea and Constructorul Galați, and was won by Chimia Râmnicu Vâlcea after a replay. It was the 1st cup for Chimia Râmnicu Vâlcea.

Both teams played in 1–4–2–4 formula, 1 GK, 4 DF, 2 MF and 4 FW.

The 1973 Cupa României Final was the 3rd final in the history of the Romanian Cup when the winner established after a replay. The other two finals with replay(s) were played in 1934 and 1940.

This final remained in history because it was the first one with no club from Divizia A in the final.

The final is also known as "Finala desculților" (English: "The final of the poor") because the team from Râmnicu Vâlcea was playing in Divizia B and the team from Galați was playing in Divizia C at the time of the final.                                   
                                               
Chimia Râmnicu Vâlcea became the third club representing Divizia B which won the Romanian Cup final, after Metalul Reșița which accomplished this in 1954, and Arieșul Turda which accomplished this in 1961. Constructorul Galați became the second club representing Divizia C that reached the Romanian Cup final, after Foresta Fălticeni in 1967.

Constructorul Galați become the champion of 1972–73 Divizia C at the end of the season.

Match details

Replay

See also 
List of Cupa României finals

References

External links
Romaniansoccer.ro

1973
Cupa
Romania